The SFCA Lignel 46 Coach was a French four seat touring aircraft built soon after World War II. It was SFCA's last design, with two prototypes built, flown and raced but engine supply problems prevented production.

Design and development

The Lignel 46 was the last aircraft produced by Société Française de Construction Aéronautique (SFCA). It was a cantilever low wing monoplane, seating four in two side-by-side rows under a multipart glazed canopy.  The two main transparencies opened away from each other on vertical, forward hinges for cabin access. There was a  Mathis G8R or Mathis G8 20 inverted V-8 engine, driving an automatic variable pitch propeller in the nose; behind the cabin the fuselage tapered linearly from the full cabin depth.  The Lignel 46 was a wooden aircraft and its monocoque fuselage was built using a composite shell composed of perforated cork sheets between inner and outer shaped plywood layers, a method patented by Jean Broudeau and one that SFCA had explored before World War II.

The wings of the Lignel 46 were broadly similar to those of the SFCA Lignel 20.  The central and outer panels were distinguished by the lack of dihedral on the former; both had straight, unswept leading edges but the trailing edge of the outer panels was curved, producing a roughly elliptical plan.  Like the Lignel 20 the 46 had somewhat inset ailerons and split flaps.  The Lignel 46 also had unusual, very small fixed leading edge slots at the wing tips. Apart from its variable incidence tailplane, mounted at mid-height on the fuselage, the empennage was conventional, with a rounded fin and rudder. It had a fixed, tailwheel undercarriage with both landing legs and wheels in aircraft fairings.

The SFCA Lignel 46 first flew on 13 August 1947. Two were completed. One of them was on display at the 18th Paris Aeronautical Salon which opened on 29 May 1949, by which time it had done significant flying. Mathis went out of business in 1950 and SFCA decided not to re-engine the Type 46, though the two prototypes remained active until at least 1951.

Operational history

In its short operational life the Lignal 46 took part in several major competitions. Its best result by far was in 1948, when Jean Lignel took it to first place from a field of over fifty aircraft contesting the Italian Rally. In the summer of 1949 one flew in the Grand Prix de Meaux, though without distinction. In 1951 Louis Clément flew the first prototype F-BCZJ in the same race, finishing in mid-field.

Specifications

References

1940s French sport aircraft
SFCA aircraft
Low-wing aircraft
Single-engined tractor aircraft
Aircraft first flown in 1947